Alive Behind the Green Door is a live album by the Celtic punk band Flogging Molly, recorded at Molly Malone's in 1997.

Songs 
The album features two cover songs, "What's Made Milwaukee Famous (Has Made a Loser Out of Me)" and "De (That's All Right) Lilah", which is a combination of "Delilah" by Tom Jones and "That's All Right (Mama)" by Elvis Presley. Of the original songs on the album, the song "Never Met a Girl Like You Before" has not been recorded in the studio. "Every Dog Has Its Day", "Selfish Man", and "Black Friday Rule" were recorded for Swagger (2000), "Swagger" and "If I Ever Leave This World Alive" were recorded for Drunken Lullabies (2002), "Laura" was recorded for Whiskey on a Sunday (2006), and "Between a Man and a Woman" was recorded for Float (2008).

Track listing 
All songs by Flogging Molly unless otherwise noted.
"Swagger" – 2:50
"Every Dog Has His Day" – 4:42
"Selfish Man" – 3:08
"Never Met a Girl Like You Before" – 3:36
"Laura" – 4:40
"If I Ever Leave This World Alive" – 3:44
"Black Friday Rule" – 8:20
"What Made Milwaukee Famous (Made a Loser Out of Me)" (Glenn Sutton) – 2:45
"Between a Man and a Woman" – 4:00
"De (That's All Right) Lilah" (Arthur Crudup, John Barry Mason, David Leslie Reed) – 8:35

Personnel 
 Dave King – vocals, acoustic guitar
 Bridget Regan – violin
 Ted Hutt – electric guitar
 Jeff Peters – bass
 George Schwindt – drums
 Toby McCallum – mandolin

References 

Flogging Molly albums
1997 live albums